Antônio Prado de Minas is a municipality located in the state of Minas Gerais, Brazil. Its population  is estimated to be 1,587 people living in an area of 85.042 km². The city belongs to the microregion of Muriaé within the mesoregion of Zona da Mata.

See also
 List of municipalities in Minas Gerais

References

Municipalities in Minas Gerais